Proposition 22 may refer to:
 2020 California Proposition 22, about app-based transportation
 2000 California Proposition 22, about marriage